Below is a list of beaches in the Brazilian state of Rio Grande do Norte by municipality.

In the state are located dozens of beaches, from virgin to urban ones, and famous for its dunes and cliffs.

Urban area

Natal 

 Areia Preta
 Praia dos Artistas
 Praia do Meio
 Praia do Forte
 Ponta Negra
 Redinha

North Coast

Extremoz 

 Genipabu
 Pitangui
 Redinha Nova
 Santa Rita
 Graçandu

Ceará-Mirim 
 Prainha
 Muriú
 Porto-Mirim 
 Jacumã

Maxaranguape 
 Maracajaú
 Caraúbas
 Ponta Gorda
 Cabo de São Roque
 Barra de Maxaranguape

Rio do Fogo 
 Barra de Punaú
 Perobas
 Pititinga
 Rio do Fogo
 Zumbi

Touros 
 Calcanhar
 Carnaubinha
 Gameleira 
 Garças
 Touros

São Miguel do Gostoso 
 Cardeiro
 Ponta do Santo Cristo
 Xêpa
 Praia do Maceió
 Tourinhos

Pedra Grande 
 Enxú Queimado
 Praia da Barra
 Praia dos Currais
 Arraial do Marco

São Bento do Norte 
 Praia do Farol
 Praia do Serafim

Caiçara do Norte 
 Praia de Caiçara do Norte

Galinhos 
 Praia do Farol
 Praia do Capim
 Praia de Galos
 Praia de Galinhos

Guamaré 
 Aratuá
 Praia do Amaro
 Praia da Atabaia
 Praia do Minhoto

Macau 
 Praia de Barreiras
 Praia de Camapum
 Praia Diogo Lopes

Porto do Mangue 
 Pedra Grande 
 Praia da Costinha

Areia Branca 
 Praia Ponta do Mel
 Praia Redonda
 Praia do Rosado
 Praia São Cristovão

Tibau 
 Praia de Tibau

South Coast

Parnamirim 
 Praia de Pium
 Praia de Cotovelo
 Pirangi do Norte

Nísia Floresta 
 Pirangi do Sul
 Praia de Búzios
 Camurupim
 Barreta
 Barra de Tabatinga

Senador Georgino Avelino 
 Praia de Malembá

Tibau do Sul 
 Praia de Cacimbinhas
 Praia de Pipa
 Baía dos Golfinhos
 Praia do Amor 
 Praia do Madeiro
 Praia das Minas
 Praia do Giz
 Sibaúma

Canguaretama 
 Barra de Cunhaú

Baía Formosa 
 Sagi
 Praia de Bacupari
 Perobas 
 Barreirinhas

References

Landforms of Rio Grande do Norte
Tourist attractions in Rio Grande do Norte
Lists of beaches in Brazil